Dan Prothero is an American, New Orleans-based independent record producer, recording engineer, and record collector. He has been called "the true king of raw" by [ AllMusic], for his emphasis on live performance, vintage analog recording techniques, and gritty drum tones.

He founded Fog City Records in 1996, and began recording a string of widely acclaimed debut records which served as a springboard for the careers of Galactic, Stanton Moore, Garage A Trois, Papa Mali, Robert Walter's 20th Congress, MOFRO, Etienne de Rocher, and Tim Bluhm.

As an independent producer, Prothero has also recorded follow-up records with artists including Galactic and Robert Walter, and remains the ongoing producer of choice for Florida soul band MOFRO. He has also produced drum records with legends Bernard Purdie and Headhunters drummer Mike Clark, and created "Bulldog Breaks", the highly acclaimed (and widely sampled) series of breakbeat records.

Prior to starting his own label, Prothero helped develop the look and sound of Bay Area label Ubiquity Recordings from its inception in 1989, forming and/or producing many of the groups that appeared on its wildly successful initial releases (Rhythm Section, Slide Five, New Legends, Sweet Potato, etc.), writing liner notes and creating most of the graphic design for Ubiquity and its vintage re-release label Luv N Haight. He continues to create all of the graphic design for releases on his own Fog City Records imprint, as well as programming the Enhanced CD content that accompanies them.

In addition, Prothero teamed up with Turntable Media, working on numerous Enhanced CD and Interactive TV projects.

Selected discography (producer)
 Galactic - "Coolin' Off" - Fog City Records, 1996
 Stanton Moore - "All Kooked Out!" - Fog City Records, 1998
 Galactic - "Crazyhorse Mongoose" - Volcano Records, 1998
 Garage A Trois - "Mysteryfunk" - Fog City Records, 1999
 Papa Mali - "Thunder Chicken" - Fog City Records, 1999
 Robert Walter's 20th Congress - "Money Shot" - Fog City Records, 2000
 MOFRO - "Blackwater" - Fog City Records, 2001
 MOFRO - "Lochloosa" - 2004
 Robert Walter - "In A Holiday Groove" - Fog City Records, 2004
 Tim Bluhm - "California Way" - Fog City Records, 2005
 Etienne de Rocher - "Etienne de Rocher" - Fog City Records, 2006
 Papa Mali - Do Your Thing - 2007
 JJ Grey & MOFRO - "Country Ghetto" - 2007
 JJ Grey & MOFRO - "Orange Blossoms" - 2008
 JJ Grey & MOFRO - "Georgia Warhorse" - 2010
 Tim Bluhm & Nicki Bluhm - "Duets" - 2011
 JJ Grey & MOFRO - "This River" - 2013
 JJ Grey & MOFRO - "Ol Glory" - 2015

Selected discography (Enhanced CD Programming)
 Galactic - "Coolin' Off" - Fog City Records, 1996
 Stanton Moore - "All Kooked Out!" - Fog City Records, 1998
 Papa Mali - "Thunder Chicken" - Fog City Records, 1999
 Robert Walter's 20th Congress - "Money Shot" - Fog City Records, 2000
 MOFRO - "Blackwater" - Fog City Records, 2001
 Tim Bluhm - "California Way" - Fog City Records, 2005

References

External links
 Biography
 [ Discography]
 Feature article

American record producers
American audio engineers
Living people
Year of birth missing (living people)